The RFL Championship Leaders' Shield is a shield awarded to the team finishing the season top of Championship in the sport of rugby league football. Currently the Shield is awarded to the team finishing top of the Championship at the end of the regular season. The Championship play-offs determine the league Champions and promotion to Super League.

History
Since the formation of the Championship in 2003, the team finishing top of the league have been awarded the League Leaders' Shield before entering the playoffs to decide the Champions. Between 2015 and 2018 the league leaders were awarded the Championship title before The Qualifiers began. From 2019 the league reverted to a playoff series and the shield was awarded before the playoffs again.

Results

Winners

See also
League Leaders' Shield
Championship Grand Final

References

Rugby league trophies and awards
Rugby Football League Championship